Chhewang Nima ( 1967 – 23 October 2010) was a well known Nepalese  Sherpa who had climbed Mount Everest 19 times. He was also called Chuwang Nima, and Chuwang Nima Sherpa. 

His disappearance after being struck by an avalanche near the summit of Mount Baruntse, was reported on 24 October 2010. On 25 October, the search had been called off. His loss in the avalanche and subsequent search made international news.  He worked as a professional mountaineer, but at the time of his loss he was helping another team fix lines after they had asked for help.

Notable ascents

Everest
May 19, 1998
May 20, 2006 Chuwang Nima Sherpa (Tesho, Nepal)
Ama Dablam 
October 26, 2009 Chuwang Nima Sherpa (Tesho, Nepal)

At the time of Chhewang's death, he had summited Everest 19 times, which was then one short of Apa Sherpa's record of 20 (which Apa has since increased).

See also
List of Mount Everest summiters by number of times to the summit
List of 20th-century summiters of Mount Everest

References

1960s births
2010 deaths
Sherpa summiters of Mount Everest
Nepalese mountain climbers
Nepalese summiters of Mount Everest
Deaths in avalanches
Mountaineering deaths in Nepal
Nepalese Buddhists
Natural disaster deaths in Nepal
Deceased Everest summiters